Trea may refer to:

People
 Trea Pipkin (born 1980/81), American judge
 Trea Turner (born 1993), American baseball player
 Trea Wiltshire, Australian writer

Others
 Trea Commune (Samraong District), Takéo Province, Cambodia

See also
 Trey (disambiguation)
 Trae, a list of people with the given name or nickname
 Tre (disambiguation)
 Tray (disambiguation)